Charles Henry Meredith Thring (21 January 1861 — 11 April 1939) was an English first-class cricketer and scholastic agent.

The son of John Charles Thring, a schoolmaster at Uppingham School, he was born at Uppingham in January 1861. He was educated at Marlborough College. Thring played first-class cricket for the Marylebone Cricket Club (MCC) against Oxford University at Oxford in 1889. Batting once in the match, he was dismissed in for 12 runs by Reginald Moss in the MCC first innings. Thring died in April 1939 at Chilcompton, Somerset. His uncle, Theodore Thring, also played first-class cricket.

References

External links

1861 births
1939 deaths
People from Uppingham
People educated at Marlborough College
English cricketers
Marylebone Cricket Club cricketers
19th-century English businesspeople
20th-century English businesspeople